Joseph Salvatore Lovano (born December 29, 1952) is an American jazz saxophonist, alto clarinetist, flautist, and drummer.  He has earned a Grammy Award and several mentions on Down Beat magazine's critics' and readers' polls. His wife, with whom he records and performs, is singer Judi Silvano. Lovano was a longtime member of drummer Paul Motian‘s trio with guitarist Bill Frisell.

Biography

Early life
Lovano was born in Cleveland, Ohio, United States, to Sicilian-American parents; his father was the tenor saxophonist Tony ("Big T") Lovano. His father's family came from Alcara Li Fusi in Sicily, and his mother's family came from Cesarò, also in Sicily. In Cleveland, Lovano's father exposed him to jazz throughout his early life, teaching him the standards, as well as how to lead a gig, pace a set, and be versatile enough to find work. Lovano started on alto saxophone at age six and switched to tenor saxophone five years later. John Coltrane, Dizzy Gillespie, and Sonny Stitt were among his earlier influences. After graduating from Euclid High School in 1971, he went to Berklee College of Music, where he studied under Herb Pomeroy and Gary Burton.  Lovano received an honorary doctorate of music from the college in 1998.

Career
After Berklee he worked with Jack McDuff and Lonnie Smith. He spent three years with the Woody Herman orchestra, then moved to New York City, where he played with the big band of Mel Lewis. He often plays lines that convey the rhythmic drive and punch of an entire horn section. In the mid 1980s Lovano began working in a quartet with John Scofield and in a trio with Bill Frisell and Paul Motian. 

In 1991 Joe Lovano began a lengthy and acclaimed run on Blue Note Records with Landmarks and From the Soul (the latter featuring Michel Petrucciani, Dave Holland and Ed Blackwell).  Many outstanding releases followed, including  the highly diverse Rush Hour (tracks range from solo to big band), collaborations with saxophonists Joshua Redman (Tenor Legacy) and Greg Osby (Friendly Fire), 52nd Street Themes (with a nonet), and four albums featuring the classic pianist Hank Jones.  
 
In 1993, he played on the album Anything Went by guitarist Bill DeArango, a native of Cleveland. In the late 1990s, he formed the Saxophone Summit with Dave Liebman and Michael Brecker (later replaced by Ravi Coltrane). Streams of Expression (2006) was a tribute to both cool jazz and free jazz. Lovano and pianist Hank Jones released an album together in June 2007, entitled Kids. He played the tenor saxophone on the 2007 McCoy Tyner album Quartet.

In 2008 Lovano formed the quintet Us Five with Esperanza Spalding on bass, pianist James Weidman, and two drummers, Francisco Mela and Otis Brown III. Folk Art was an album of compositions by Lovano that the band hoped to interpret in the spirit of the avant-garde jazz and loft jazz of the 1960s. Bird Songs (2011) was a tribute to Charlie Parker. West African guitarist Lionel Loueke appeared on the album Cross Culture (Blue Note, 2013). Lovano played reed and percussion instruments he had collected since the 1970s. Peter Slavov replaced Esperanza Spalding on six tracks, all of them written by Lovano except for "Star Crossed Lovers" by Billy Strayhorn. "The idea [...] wasn't just to play at the same time, but to collectively create music within the music," Lovano wrote in the liner notes to Cross Culture. "Everyone is leading and following," and "the double drummer configuration adds this other element of creativity."

In recent years Lovano has released three records with trumpeter Dave Douglas in a co-led group called Sound Prints.  He has also moved over to ECM records, largely adopting the mellow vibe and use of space characteristic of the label.  He is a high-profile guest on the acclaimed Arctic Riff (2020) by Polish pianist Marcin Wasilewski.

Lovano has taught at the Berklee College of Music. He taught Jeff Coffin after Coffin was given a NEA Jazz Studies Grant in 1991.

Downbeat magazine gave its Jazz Album of the Year Award to Lovano for Quartets: Live at the Village Vanguard.

Instruments
Lovano has played Borgani saxophones since 1991 and exclusively since 1999. He has his own series called Borgani-Lovano, with a pearl silver body and 24K gold keys.

Discography

As leader 
 1985: Tones, Shapes & Colors (Soul Note, 1985) – live
 1986: Hometown Sessions (JSL, 1986)
 1986: Solid Steps (Jazz Club, 1986)
 1988: Village Rhythm (Soul Note, 1989)
 1989: Worlds (Evidence, 1989) – live
 1989: Ten Tales with Aldo Romano (Sunnyside, 1994)
 1990: Landmarks (Blue Note, 1990)
 1991: Sounds of Joy (Enja, 1991)
 1991: From the Soul (Blue Note, 1992)
 1992: Universal Language (Blue Note, 1992)
 1993: Tenor Legacy (Blue Note, 1993)
 1994: Rush Hour (Blue Note, 1995)
 1994–95: Quartets: Live at the Village Vanguard (Blue Note, 1995) – live
 1996: Celebrating Sinatra (Blue Note, 1996)
 1996: Tenor Time (Somethin' Else, 1997)
 1997: Trio Fascination: Edition One (Blue Note, 1998)
 1999: 52nd Street Themes (Blue Note, 2000)
 2000: Flights of Fancy: Trio Fascination Edition Two (Blue Note, 2001)
 2001: Viva Caruso (Blue Note, 2002)
 2002: On This Day ... at the Vanguard (Blue Note, 2003) – live
 2003: I'm All For You (Blue Note, 2004)
 2004: Joyous Encounter (Blue Note, 2005)
 2005: Streams of Expression (Blue Note, 2006)
 2005: Symphonica (Blue Note, 2008) – live
 2005: Classic! Live at Newport feat. Hank Jones, George Mraz & Lewis Nash (Blue Note, 2016) – live
 2008: Folk Art (Blue Note, 2009)
 2010: Bird Songs with Us Five (Blue Note, 2011)
 2012: Cross Culture with Us Five (Blue Note, 2013)
 2018: Trio Tapestry with Marilyn Crispell & Carmen Castaldi (ECM, 2019)
 2019: Garden of Expression with Marilyn Crispell & Carmen Castaldi (ECM, 2021)

As co-leader 
With Dave Douglas
 Sound Prints (Blue Note, 2015) – recorded in 2013

With James Emery, Judi Silvano and Drew Gress
 Fourth World (Between the Lines, 2001)

With Jim Hall, George Mraz, and Lewis Nash
 Grand Slam: Live at the Regatta Bar (Telarc, 2000)

With Hank Jones
 Kids: Live at Dizzy's Club Coca-Cola (Blue Note, 2007) – live recorded in 2006

With Benjamin Koppel
 The Mezzo Sax Encounter (Cowbell, 2016)

With Greg Osby
 Friendly Fire (Blue Note, 1999) – recorded in 1998

With Gonzalo Rubalcaba
 Flying Colors (Blue Note, 1997)

With Enrico Rava
 Roma (ECM, 2019)

With Marcin Wasilewski Trio
Arctic Riff (ECM, 2020)

As group 
Saxophone Summit (with Michael Brecker, Dave Liebman)
 Gathering of Spirits (Telarc, 2004)

ScoLoHoFo (with John Scofield, Dave Holland, Al Foster)
 Oh! (Blue Note, 2003)

SFJAZZ Collective
 Live 2008: 5th Annual Concert Tour - The Works of Wayne Shorter (SFJAZZ, 2008)[3CD]
 Live 2009: 6th Annual Concert Tour - The Music of McCoy Tyner (SFJAZZ, 2009)[2CD]

As sideman 

With John Abercrombie
 1998: Open Land (ECM, 1999)
 2011: Within a Song (ECM, 2012)

With Marc Johnson
 2004: Shades of Jade (ECM, 2005)
 2010: Swept Away (ECM, 2012)

With Paul Motian
 Psalm with Ed Schuller and Billy Drewes (ECM, 1982) – recorded in 1981
 The Story of Maryam with Ed Schuller and Jim Pepper (Soul Note, 1984)
 Jack of Clubs with Ed Schuller and Jim Pepper (Soul Note, 1985)
 It Should've Happened a Long Time Ago (ECM, 1985)
 Misterioso with Ed Schuller and Jim Pepper (Soul Note, 1986)
 One Time Out (Soul Note, 1989) – recorded in 1987
 Monk in Motian (JMT, 1989) – recorded in 1988
 On Broadway Volume 1 (JMT, 1989)
 Bill Evans (JMT, 1990)
 On Broadway Volume 2 (JMT, 1990)
 Motian in Tokyo (JMT, 1991)
 On Broadway Volume 3 (JMT, 1993)
 Trioism (JMT, 1993) trio + guest
 At the Village Vanguard (JMT, 1995) – trio
 Sound of Love (JMT, 1995) – trio live
 I Have the Room Above Her (ECM, 2004) – trio
 Time and Time Again (ECM, 2006) – trio

With John Scofield
 1989: Time on My Hands (Blue Note, 1990)
 1990: Meant to Be (Blue Note, 1991)
 1992: What We Do (Blue Note, 1993)
 2015: Past Present (Impulse!, 2015)

With Steve Slagle
 New New York, Omnitone, 12005 (2000)
 Alto Manhattan, Panorama 1006, (2016)With Lonnie Smith Afro–desia (Groove Merchant, 1975)
 Keep on Lovin' (Groove Merchant, 1976)With Bill Stewart Snide Remarks (Blue Note, 1995)
 Think Before You Think (Evidence, 1998)With Roseanna Vitro Reaching for the Moon (Chase Music Group, 1991)
 Tropical Postcards (A Records, 2004)With Yōsuke Yamashita Kurdish Dance (Verve, 1992)
 Dazzling Days (Verve, 1993)With others' Cindy Blackman, Another Lifetime (4Q, 2010) – recorded in 2005–09
 Michael Bocian, For This Gift (Gunmar, 1982) 
 Furio di Castri, Unknown Voyage (A Témpo, 1985)
 Ray Drummond, Excursion (Arabesque, 1993) – recorded in 1992
 Peter Erskine, Sweet Soul (Novus/BMG, 1991) 
 Antonio Faraò, Evan (Cristal, 2013)
 Sonny Fortune, From Now On (Blue Note, 1996)
 Paul Grabowsky, Tales of time and Space (Sanctuary Records, 2005) 
 Charlie Haden, The Montreal Tapes: Liberation Music Orchestra (Verve, 1999) – recorded in 1989
 Tom Harrell, Sail Away (Contemporary, 1989)
 Steve Kuhn, Mostly Coltrane (ECM, 2009) – recorded in 2008
 Pat Martino, Think Tank (Blue Note, 2003)
 Masada Quintet,  Stolas: Book of Angels Volume 12 (Tzadik, 2009)
 Chris Potter, Vertigo (Concord, 1998)
 Dan Silverman, Silverslide (Around the Slide, 2007)
 Tommy Smith, Evolution (Spartacus, 2003)
 Steve Swallow, Real Book (Xtra Watt, 1994) – recorded in 1993
 McCoy Tyner, Quartet'' (McCoy Tyner Music, 2007) – live

References

External links
 Official website
 Joe Lovano at NPR Music
 Podcast featuring "The One You Love to Hate" performed by Joe Lovano
 NAMM Oral History Interview October 15, 2014
 

1952 births
Living people
Musicians from Cleveland
American people of Italian descent
Berklee College of Music alumni
Berklee College of Music faculty
Record producers from Ohio
American male saxophonists
Big band bandleaders
Grammy Award winners
Jazz record producers
Jazz tenor saxophonists
Post-bop jazz musicians
21st-century American saxophonists
21st-century American male musicians
American male jazz musicians
SFJAZZ Collective members
American jazz educators
Blue Note Records artists
Black Saint/Soul Note artists
Sunnyside Records artists
Enja Records artists
ECM Records artists
ArtistShare artists